Stéphane Gomez (born August 2, 1976 in Millau, France) is an open water swimmer from France.

He won the French National Championships in:
5K: 2001, 2002
10K: 2000, 2002
25K: 2007

See also
 Gomez's entry on French Wikipedia.

References

People from Millau
1976 births
French male long-distance swimmers
Living people
World Aquatics Championships medalists in open water swimming
Sportspeople from Aveyron